Walter Guy Morrison (August 29, 1895 – August 14, 1934) was a professional baseball player. He played briefly in the majors for the Boston Braves in 1927 and 1928. He also served as the baseball and football coach at Montclair State University in 1929. He died of a self-inflicted gunshot wound in 1934.

Minor leagues
Morrison began his career in 1920 with the Evansville Evas. He would play for the Evas, Bloomington Bloomers, Decatur Commodores, Bloomington Cubs and Peoria Tractors of the Illinois–Indiana–Iowa League. He also played for the Providence Grays and Waterbury Brasscos of the Eastern League. In 1923, he played for the San Antonio Bears of the Texas League. In 1926 he played for the Idaho Falls Spuds of the Utah–Idaho League.

Role in the NFL
In 1921, Morrison signed an agreement with Frank Fausch, the owner of the Evansville Crimson Giants of the National Football League. The two arranged for a benefit game that would provide funds for the construction of a World War I veterans' memorial. Immediately the Giants secured the exclusive use of the only suitable stadium in Evansville, Bosse Field. As a result, Fausch's team became the only pro football team in Evansville, as the semi-pro Evansville Ex-Collegians were forced to join the Crimson Giants.

College football
Morrison was the first head coach in Montclair State University's history. He coached for two seasons, 1928 and 1929, compiling a 2–7–1 overall record.

Head coaching record

References

Baseball Reference: Guy Morrison
Baseball Almanac: Guy Morrison

1895 births
1934 suicides
Baseball players from West Virginia
Major League Baseball pitchers
Boston Braves players
Evansville Crimson Giants
Montclair State Red Hawks baseball coaches
Montclair State Red Hawks football coaches
People from Hinton, West Virginia
West Virginia Wesleyan Bobcats baseball players
Idaho Falls Spuds players
Suicides by firearm in Michigan